Soul Diaspora is a 2009 film written and directed by Odera Ozoka. The film received three nominations at the 6th Africa Movie Academy Awards in 2010 for Best Actor in a Leading Role, Best film by an African Filmmaker in Diaspora, and AMAA Achievement in Sound, winning the award for Best film by an African Filmmaker in Diaspora. In addition, the film won the Audience Favorite Award at the 2010 Pan African Film Festival in Los Angeles, United States.

Plot
The story depicts Saidu (Sadiq Abu), a Nigerian immigrant living in Los Angeles who is forced to overcome sleepless nights of his tormented past in Africa. The audience finds him alone in this modern world, often hearing voices in his head, sometimes not even his, as the film interweaves color and black and white to illustrate this protagonist's conflicted behavior and tortured mental state.

Saidu's "life's path" brings him to working less than minimum wage at a mechanic shop, forging little by little a friendship with a sixteen-year-old Afghani-American, Reza (Kristian Steel), the son of the shop's friendly owner. Yet, even then, the mysterious Saidu is unable to fully overcome his alienation and loneliness. He soon meets and bonds with a stripper, Latisha (Mimi Vasser), after frequenting the same bar.

During the film, the audience meets an African-American named Tyrone (Serge Eustache) who may not share Saidu's morality, but is confronted with internal troubles. He is embroiled in a seamy love triangle with Saidu's encounter, Latisha and another woman, Lori (Maggie Maki), whom he has no feelings for but seems unable-or rather unwilling to rid himself of.

All the characters' souls are stripped to the core by one searing (and national) event, which give them all fresh perspective.

Cast
Sadiq Abu
Kristian Steel
Mimi Vasser
Clotilde Delavennat
Brendan Jackson
Maggie Maki
Serge Eustache
Donald Ajluni

References

External links
 
 

2009 films
Best Film by an African Living Abroad Africa Movie Academy Award winners
2000s English-language films
American drama films